Sleep surgery is a surgery performed to treat sleep disordered breathing. Sleep disordered breathing is a spectrum of disorders that includes snoring, upper airway resistance syndrome, and obstructive sleep apnea. These surgeries are performed by surgeons trained in otolaryngology, oral maxillofacial surgery, and craniofacial surgery.

Definitions 
Obstructive sleep apnea or sleep apnea is defined as either cessation of breathing (apnea) for 10 seconds, or a decrease in normal breathing (hypopnea) with an associated desaturation in oxygen and arousal during sleep that lasts at least 10 seconds. In adults, it is typical to have up to 4.9 events per hour. In obstructive sleep apnea, affected individuals are categorized based on how many apneas or hypopneas (apnea-hypopnea index or AHI) or events they have per hour.

 Normal: <5 events per hour
 Mild: 5 to <15 events per hour
 Moderate: 15 to 30 events per hour
 Severe: >30 events per hour

The Wisconsin Sleep Cohort Study, a longitudinal study of the natural history of obstructive sleep apnea (OSA), found that of a random sample (602 employed men and women, 30–60 years old) the prevalence of OSA (5 or more events/hr) was 9% for women and 24% for men. However, the study found that among sleepy patients in this group, 2% of women and 4% of men met criteria for obstructive sleep apnea syndrome (OSAS). Those who snored habitually, were more likely to have an AHI of 15 or more.

Clinical results 
Most obstructive sleep apnea sufferers have multiple points of obstruction in their airway and therefore require multilevel sleep surgery in order to maximize the efficacy of treatment. A systematic review of the literature and meta-analysis showed that multilevel sleep surgery achieves a 60.3% apnea hypopnea index (AHI) reduction. This reduction in sleep apnea severity via surgical means compares well against the AHI reduction for best case CPAP patients where an overall AHI reduction of 66% was achieved. Even single level surgical intervention in sleep apnea, which demonstrates a lesser degree of AHI reduction, showed a 31% survival benefit when compared against those using CPAP as therapy.

In children 
Children with obstructive sleep apnea typically have enlarged tonsils and adenoid tissue. Surgery on children is over 80% successful by simply performing an adenoidectomy and tonsillectomy. Those less likely to benefit from an adenotonsillectomy are obese children and those with other medical problems, such as Down Syndrome.

A sub-group of children may have occult laryngomalacia, where the tissue directly above the vocal cords (epiglottis, arytenoids) collapses into the airway during sleep. These children may benefit from a supraglottoplasty to help prevent that tissue from collapsing into the airway.

Surgical procedures 
In adults, various surgeries treat specific causes for nasal and soft palate.

Obstruction in adults is most often multiple level, so the most successful surgeries involve multi-level surgery.

Tonsillectomy and/or adenoidectomy 
Some adults with large tonsils may be candidates for having their  tonsils and/or adenoids removed either alone or in combination with other procedures, such as uvulopalatopharyngoplasty (UPPP) or nasal surgery.

Uvulopalatopharyngoplasty (UPPP) 

The procedure most commonly performed for sleep apnea is the uvulopalatopharyngoplasty (UPPP). This involves removal of the tonsils if still present, and a subsequent palatal procedure. The tonsil pillars are often sutured closed—and the uvula is either trimmed, cut, folded, reshaped, or sutured to the soft palate. Studies have shown that treatment effect of UPPP with tonsillectomy increases with tonsil size.

Hyoid suspension 

Hyoid suspension, also known as hyoid myotomy and suspension or hyoid advancement, is a surgical procedure in which the hyoid bone and its muscle attachments to the tongue and airway are pulled forward in order to increase airway size and improve airway stability behind and below the base of tongue (retrolingual and hypopharyngeal region).

Genioglossus advancement 

Genioglossus advancement (GA) also known as genial tubercle advancement (GTA), is a procedure that pulls the base of the tongue forward, usually to increase airway size due to deformity or a sleep breathing disorder. This procedure is frequently performed with either uvulopalatopharyngoplasty or maxillomandibular advancement surgeries.

Tongue muscles (genioglossus, geniohyoid and others) are attached to the lower jaw below the teeth. During a genioglossus advancement procedure, the surgeon cuts a small window or bone cut in the front part of the lower jaw (mandible) at the level of the geniotubercle where the genioglossus muscle attaches. This piece of bone, along with the attachment for the tongue (genial tubercle) is pulled forward and subsequently secured to the lower jaw, usually with a single screw or with a plate and screws.

This procedure is often combined with other surgeries such as uvulopalatopharyngoplasties or maxillomandibular advancement surgeries. It is rare to have this procedure performed as the only surgical treatment for sleep apnea, as obstruction in sleep apnea is most often at multiple levels (nose, palate, tongue, etc.).

Maxillomandibular advancement 

Maxillomandibular advancement (MMA) or orthognathic surgery, also sometimes called bimaxillary advancement (bi-max), or maxillomandibular osteotomy (MMO), is a procedure that moves the upper jaw (maxilla) and the lower jaw (mandible) forward.
The procedure was first used to correct deformities of the facial skeleton, including malocclusion. In the late 1970s, advancement of the lower jaw (mandibular advancement) improved sleepiness in three patients. Subsequently, maxillomandibular advancement was used for patients with obstructive sleep apnea.

Currently, surgeons often perform maxillomandibular advancement surgery simultaneously with genioglossus advancement (tongue advancement). The genioglossus advancement pulls the tongue forward to decrease the amount of tongue blockage during sleep. MMA is one of the most effective surgical treatments for sleep apnea, with a high success rate. Nonetheless, the procedure is often used after other forms of treatment have failed (nasal surgeries, tonsillectomy, uvulopalatopharyngoplasty, tongue reduction surgeries). There is a longer recovery when compared to other sleep apnea surgeries, since the bones of the face have to heal into their new position.

Tracheostomy 

Tracheostomy is the only surgical procedure that completely bypasses the upper airway. This procedure was commonly performed in the 1960-1980's for obstructive sleep apnea, until other procedures such as the uvulopalatopharyngoplasty, hyoid suspension, genioglossus advancement, and maxillomandibular advancement surgeries were described as alternative surgical modalities for OSA.

Therapy alternatives

Continuous positive airway pressure 

In 1981, Dr. Sullivan and colleagues introduced continuous positive airway pressure (CPAP), which replaced tracheostomy as the gold standard treatment for obstructive sleep apnea. CPAP machines are specially designed to deliver a constant flow or pressure.  Some CPAP machines have other features as well, such as heated humidifiers.   CPAP is the most effective treatment for obstructive sleep apnea, in which the pressure from CPAP prevents the airway from collapsing or becoming blocked.

Mandibular advancement device 

A mandibular advancement device or mandibular advancement splint may be used in select patients as treatment for mild or moderate OSA. Where appropriate, they are considered a good therapy choice as they are non-invasive, easily reversible, quiet, and generally well accepted by the patient. The focus of improvement in appliance design is in reducing bulk, permitting free jaw movement (i.e., yawning, speaking, and drinking), and allowing the user to breathe through their mouth (early "welded gum shield"-type devices prevented oral breathing).

Over the last decade, there has been a significant expansion in the evidence base supporting the use of oral devices in the treatment of OSA. Robust studies demonstrating their efficacy have been underpinned by increasing recognition of the importance of upper airway anatomy in the pathophysiology of OSA. Oral devices have been shown to have a beneficial effect in targeting a number of significant clinical end points. These include the polysomnographic indexes of OSA, subjective and objective measures of sleepiness, blood pressure, aspects of neuropsychological functioning, and quality of life. Elucidation of the mechanism of action of oral devices has provided insight into the factors that predict treatment response and may improve the selection of patients for this treatment modality. A further study by Dr. Edmund Rose, University of Freiburg (2004), successfully treated (AHI < 5) 88% of patients with MAS and proposes optimum patient selection to include AHI < 25, BMI < 30, and good dentition.

Another study published in Sleep (2008) on the influence of nasal resistance (NAR) on oral device treatment outcome in OSA demonstrates the need for an interdisciplinary approach between ENT surgeons and sleep physicians to treating OSA. The study suggests that higher levels of NAR may negatively affect outcome with MAS and subsequently methods to lower nasal resistance may improve the outcome of oral device treatment.

Tongue retaining device 

Tongue retaining devices are devices that can be placed in a manner such that the tongue is kept in a forward position. These devices have been used for snoring and obstructive sleep apnea.

Tongue retaining devices hold the tongue in place by either suction, a fixed bar, or a custom dental impression. Hybrid devices combine mandibular advancement with the tongue restraint. Tongue retaining devices have not been well-received as a therapy choice since they are invasive, and the acclimation period is long. The devices have shown high success rates for therapy in studies published in Behaviour Research and Therapy and the Journal of Clinical Sleep Medicine.

References 

 
Treatment of sleep disorders